Dmitriy Aleksandrovich Vorobyov (born 27 August 1977) is a Russian football official and a former goalkeeper. He also holds Ukrainian citizenship. He works as a goalkeepers coach for FC Afips Afipsky.

External links
 Player Info on Metalurh Official Website
 

1977 births
Living people
Russian footballers
Russian expatriate footballers
Sportspeople from Krasnodar
FC Shakhtar-2 Donetsk players
FC Kuban Krasnodar players
FC Metalurh Donetsk players
FC Metalurh Zaporizhzhia players
FC Urartu players
Armenian Premier League players
Ukrainian Premier League players
Expatriate footballers in Armenia
Expatriate footballers in Ukraine
Association football goalkeepers